Máncora District is a district in the Talara Province of the Piura Region in northwestern Peru. Its capital is the beach resort town of Máncora. Officially established as a district on November 14, 1908.

Towns and villages
 Máncora
 Angola
 Las Pocitas Mancora Chico
 Las Pocitas Tourist portal
 Mancora Chico Tourist portal
Las Pocitas Beach at Mancora Guide

Boundaries
Las Pocitas Beach is a special place of Mancora District. Is recommended for everyone who tries to be away from a town movement.

 North: Zorritos District (in the Tumbes Region)
 East: Marcavelica District (Sullana Province)
 South: Los Órganos District
 West: Pacific Ocean

Demographics
According to the 2005 Census, the district has 8,570 inhabitants.

External links
  Municipalidad Distrital de Máncora - Máncora Municipal Council official website

Districts of the Talara Province